The Saint Petersburg Mosque, when opened in 1913, was the largest mosque in Europe outside Turkey, its minarets 49 meters in height and the dome is 39 meters high. The mosque is situated in downtown St Petersburg. It can accommodate up to five thousand worshippers.

The founding stone was laid in 1910 to commemorate the 25th anniversary of the reign of Abdul Ahat Khan in Bukhara. By that time, the Muslim community of the Russian then-capital exceeded 8,000 people. The projected structure was capable of accommodating most of them. The architect Nikolai Vasilyev patterned the mosque after Gur-e-Amir, the tomb of Tamerlane in Samarkand. Its construction was completed by 1921. 

Worshippers are separated by gender during a worship service; females worship on the upper floor, while the males worship on the ground floor. The Mosque was closed to worshippers from 1940 to 1956.

History
In 1882,  Selim-Giray Tevkelev who in 1865 was appointed the Mufti of Orenburg obtained permission, from minister Count Tolstoy, to build a mosque in St. Petersburg. In 1906, the Minister formed a special committee headed by Ahun Ataulla Bayazitov to collect 750,000 rubles within 10 years  for the construction of the mosque. They organised collections all over Russia and received donations from many sponsors. The largest donor was Said Abdoul Ahad, Emir of Bukhara, who undertook all expenses for the building. 

The location of the mosque was symbolic, sited opposite the Peter and Paul Fortress, in the city centre. The permission to purchase the site was given by Emperor Nicholas II in Peterhof on 3 July 1907. That autumn, the committee approved the project by architect Nikolai Vasilyev, engineer Stepan Krichinsky, with construction overseen by Alexander von Hohen. The building facade was made by combining both oriental ornaments and a turquoise blue mosaic.

On 3 February 1910, Ahun Bayazitov laid the cornerstone for the building, attended by government, religious and social figures. Among those who attended were Mohammed Alim Khan, the ambassadors of the Ottoman Empire, and Persia, and Tevkelev, the leader of the Muslim party in the Duma.  

The walls are made of grey granite and the dome and both minarets are covered with mosaic ceramics of a sky blue colour. These were created by Peter Vaulin in his workshop in Kikerino. In addition, many skilled craftsmen from Central Asia took part working on the mosque. The facades are decorated with verses from the Qur'an using Arabic calligraphy. Internal columns are made from green marble. The mosque was covered by huge specially made carpets woven by Central Asian craftsmen. 

In 1940, Soviet authorities banned services and turned the building into a medical equipment storehouse. At the request of the first Indonesian President, Sukarno, ten days after his visit to the city, the mosque was returned to the Muslim religious community of St. Petersburg in 1956. A major restoration of the mosque was carried out in 1980.

See also
Islam in Russia
List of mosques in Russia
List of mosques in Europe

References

External links

Photographs and description
Minarets over the Neva
Saint Petersburg mosque on "Russian Mosques" (English translation)

Islamic organizations established in 1913
Mosques in Saint Petersburg
1913 establishments in the Russian Empire
Art Nouveau architecture in Saint Petersburg
Mosques completed in 1921
Mosque buildings with domes
Closed mosques in the Soviet Union
Mosques in Europe
Cultural heritage monuments of regional significance in Saint Petersburg